CannonDesign is a global architecture, engineering and consulting practice that provides services for a range of project types, including hospitals and medical centers, corporate headquarters and commercial office buildings, higher education and PK-12 education facilities, hotels and hospitality, mixed-use, sports facilities, and science and research buildings. Brad Lukanic has been the CEO of the employee-owned firm since 2015. In 2017 and 2019, Fast Company named CannonDesign one of the 10 most innovative architecture firms in the world.

History

Will Cannon, Sr. started his architecture practice in Niagara Falls, New York in 1915. His best-known work from this period was the  Beaux-Arts style Niagara Falls City Hall in 1923. When his sons, Will Jr. and Don, revealed natural talents in architecture and engineering, the trio formed a family business in 1945 that would grow from its humble roots into one of the leading design practices in the world.

Design approach
CannonDesign employs a design approach it created called Living-Centered Design. The approach addresses the complex interdependencies that exist between people, businesses, communities, society and the environment. Inspired by the best attributes of human-centered design, systems thinking and traditional architectural and engineering processes, Living-Centered Design solves challenges through the lens of the broader ecosystems they exist within—helping organizations and communities realize more impactful, systemic change.

Acquisitions
In 2009, the company acquired O'Donnell Wicklund Pigozzi & Peterson (OWP/P), a Chicago-based architecture firm.

In late 2014, CannonDesign acquired Pittsburgh firm Astorino Co. The deal allowed CannonDesign to expand its footprint into Pittsburgh.

In 2017, CannonDesign announced it was merging its global practice with FKP Architects, a Houston-based architecture firm with 90 employees. Denver-based Bennett Wagner Grody Architects also joined CannonDesign.

In 2018, gkkworks, an architectural and construction practice with a significant presence in Southern California and Denver, Colorado joined CannonDesign.

In 2019, Blue Cottage Consulting merged with CannonDesign. The merger strengthened CannonDesign's consulting and planning capabilities within the healthcare, education and workplace sectors. Juliet Rogers assumed the role as President of the company. CannonDesign formed a strategic partnership with ModularDesign+, a modular design and prefabrication firm with a 100,000-SF warehouse in Euless, Texas.

Controversies 
In August 2016, CannonDesign reached an agreement with the Justice Department and the Department of Veterans Affairs to pay a $12 million settlement after it admitted to criminal conduct kickback scheme. Prior to the settlement, the former director of the Louis Stokes Cleveland VA Medical Center hospital and later the VA hospital in Dayton, Ohio, William Montague, was sentenced to prison for his role in giving insider information to contractors in exchange for money. CannonDesign executive Mark Farmer was also sentenced to prison for his involvement in the scheme.

Notable awards and recognition
2018, Laboratory of the Year Winner, R&D Magazine 
2019, Outstanding Organization of the Year, Healthcare Design Magazine
2019, One of 9 World Changing Companies, Fast Company
2019 & 2017, One of the 10 Most Innovative Architecture Firms in the World, Fast Company 
2020, Design Firm of the Year, Engineering News-Record

Selected projects

Commercial
2012 Clorox New Pleasanton Campus
2015 Follett Corporation Headquarters Office Consolidation
2015 Lockton Companies Chicago Office Relocation
2015 Flexera Software Headquarters Relocation
2015 Zurich Insurance Group Headquarters
2017 Uber, Advanced Technology Group, Pittsburgh
2017 CJ Group, CJ Blossom Park
2019 Atlassian, Mountain View Office
2019 Showtime, West Coast Headquarters
2020 Upwork, Chicago Office Expansion

Education
2008 Texas Christian University, Brown Lupton University Union
2008 University of San Diego Price Center, renovation
2008 University of Chicago Law School, Library Tower
2014 University of Colorado Boulder, Student Recreation Center
2015 Coppin State University, Science and Technology Center
2015 Carnegie Mellon University, Cohon University Center Addition 
2016 University of Utah Lassonde Studios
2017 Waukee Innovation and Learning Center
2018 York University, Second Student Centre
2018 University of Maryland Baltimore County, Event Center
2019 North Carolina A&T State University, Student Center
2019 Richard J. Daley College, Engineering + Advanced Manufacturing Center
2020 Ohlone Community College, Academic Core
2020 Kaiser Permanente Bernard J. Tyson School of Medicine

Healthcare
2010 Advocate Lutheran General Hospital
2011 Tata Medical Center
2012 Kaleida Health Gates Vascular Institute
2013 Cedars-Sinai Medical Center OR 360 Simulation Laboratory
2015 Kaiser Permanente Kraemer Radiation Oncology Center
2016 Children's Hospital of Philadelphia, Buerger Center for Advanced Pediatric Care
2016 UC San Diego Health, Jacobs Medical Center
2017 Centre hospitalier de l’Université de Montréal
2018 Texas Children's Hospital, Lester and Sue Smith Legacy Tower
2019 Nantucket Cottage Hospital
2019 Mount Sinai Medical Center (Miami), Skolnick Surgical Tower and Hildebrandt Emergency Center

Community
1977 Buffalo Metropolitan Transportation Center
2011 Louis Stokes Cleveland VA Medical Center
2012 Buffalo State College Science and Mathematics Complex
2012 Lloyd D. George Federal District Courthouse
2012 St. Louis Public Library
2013 Museum of Tolerance

Science and technology
1994 Volen Center for Complex Systems, Brandeis University
2008 Texas Children’s Hospital, Feigin Research Center
2011 Novartis Institutes for Biomedical Research 200 Technology Square (Cambridge, Massachusetts)
2015 Novartis-Penn, Center for Advanced Cellular Therapies
2016 Yale University Sterling Chemistry Lab Renovation
2017 Novartis Institutes for BioMedical Research, Cambridge Campus 
2019 Vermont Agriculture & Environmental Laboratory
2021 Johns Hopkins University Applied Physics Laboratory, Building 201

Stadiums and sports facilities

2000 Jenny Craig Pavilion
2003 Friedman Wrestling Center, Cornell University
2003 Curb Event Center
2008 Richmond Olympic Oval
2011 TD Place Stadium
2011 Jack Nicklaus Golf Club Korea
2012 Sports and Recreation Center, Worcester Polytechnic Institute
2015 Rafferty Stadium
2017 University of Maryland, New Cole Field House
2018 Place Bell (Laval, Quebec)

References

External links

ArchDaily selected projects
Architizer firm profile

Architecture firms based in New York (state)
Architects from Buffalo, New York
Design companies established in 1945
1945 establishments in New York (state)